The Battle of the Overpass was an incident on May 26, 1937, in which Walter Reuther and members of the United Auto Workers (UAW) clashed with Ford Motor Company security guards at the River Rouge Plant complex in Dearborn, Michigan, United States. After images of the incident were released to the public, support for Henry Ford and his company greatly decreased.

Leaflet campaign
The UAW had planned a leaflet campaign entitled, "Unionism, Not Fordism", at the pedestrian overpass over Miller Road at Gate 4 of the River Rouge Plant complex.  Demanding an $8 (equivalent to $150 today) six-hour day for workers, in contrast to the $6 (equivalent to $ today) eight-hour day then in place, the campaign was planned for shift change time, with an expected 9,000 workers both entering and leaving the plant.

Ford security force response
At approximately 2 p.m., several of the leading UAW union organizers, including Walter Reuther and Richard Frankensteen, were asked by a Detroit News photographer, James R. (Scotty) Kilpatrick, to pose for a picture on the overpass, with the Ford sign in the background. While they were posing, men from Ford's Service Department, an internal security force under the direction of Harry Bennett, came from behind and began to beat them.  The number of attackers is disputed, but may have been as many as forty.

Beatings
Frankensteen had his jacket pulled over his head and was kicked and punched.  Reuther described some of the treatment he received:
Seven times they raised me off the concrete and slammed me down on it. They pinned my arms . . . and I was punched and kicked and dragged by my feet to the stairway, thrown down the first flight of steps, picked up, slammed down on the platform and kicked down the second flight. On the ground they beat and kicked me some more...

One union organizer, Richard Merriweather, suffered a broken back as the result of the beating he received.

Aftermath

Photographs
The security forces mob also attempted to destroy photographic plates, but the Detroit News photographer James R. Kilpatrick hid the photographic plates under the back seat of his car, and surrendered useless plates he had on his front seat.  News and photos of the brutal attack made headlines in newspapers across the country.

Ford
In spite of the photographs, and many witnesses who had heard his men specifically seek out Frankensteen and Reuther, security director Bennett claimed — "The affair was deliberately provoked by union officials. . . . They simply wanted to trump up a charge of Ford brutality. ... I know definitely no Ford service man or plant police were involved in any way in the fight."

UAW
The incident greatly increased support for the UAW and hurt Ford's reputation. Bennett and Ford were chastised by the National Labor Relations Board for their actions. Three years later Ford signed a contract with the UAW.

A partially fictitious account of these events appear in Upton Sinclair's book, The Flivver King.

See also

Ford Hunger March — in Detroit and Dearborn, 1932.

References

External links
 Detroit News retrospective
 Detroit News "Richard Frankensteen, the UAW's 'other guy'
 Henry Ford Museum site
 Walter P Reuther Library
 Smithsonian Magazine: Ford Won a Battle and Lost Ground

1937 labor disputes and strikes
Manufacturing industry labor disputes in the United States
Ford Motor Company labor relations
Labor disputes led by the United Auto Workers
the Overpass
Riots and civil disorder in Michigan
Labor-related violence in the United States
1937 in Detroit
Walter Reuther
Labor disputes in Michigan